Ernesto Gainza Medina (born March 5, 1979, in Valencia, Venezuela) is a professional skydiver, stunt performer and stunt coordinator, skydiving consultant, skydiving instructor and instructor examiner. 
He is also an experienced BASE jumper, wingsuit flyer and Guinness world record holder.

Professional career

Ratings 
 United States Parachute Association professional exhibition jumper
 United States Parachute Association coach
 United States Parachute Association coach examiner
 United States Parachute Association accelerated free-fall Instructor
 United States Parachute Association accelerated free-fall Instructor examiner

Parachuting certificates of proficiency & licenses 
 United States Parachute Association “A”, “B”, “C”, “D” license holder
 British Parachute Association “A”, “B”, “C” license holder
 Emirates Aerosports federation “D” license holder
 Fédération Française de Parachutisme Brevet "B3" "B4" "B5" "C"

Appointments 
 United States Parachute Association Safety & Training Advisor 2013-2016
 Emirates Aerosports Federation Safety & Training advisor 2013-2015

Competitions 
 World championships in canopy piloting, Czech Republic, 2011
 Italian canopy piloting nationals 2010
 Czech canopy piloting nationals 2007, 2009, 2011
 Spanish canopy piloting nationals 2007, 2008, 2009
 German canopy piloting nationals 2007 and 2009
 World championships in canopy piloting, South Africa, 2009
 British Parachute Association skydiving nationals 2005

Guinness World Records 
 Most crossings of the Equator during a parachute jump. Coaque, Ecuador January 2020)
 Landing the world's smallest parachute, JVX 35sf by Icarus Canopies by NZ Aero Sports. Dubai(UAE) April 2014
 Most skydivers to parachute from a balloon simultaneously Skydive Dubai(UAE), February 2013

References

 http://gulfnews.com/news/uae/general/dubai-skydiver-breaks-world-record-for-jumping-with-smallest-parachute-1.1314869
 http://www.thenational.ae/uae/venezuelan-daredevil-with-a-small-parachute-skydives-to-new-world-record-in-dubai
 http://fridaymagazine.ae/real-life/ernesto-gainza-medina-i-m-for-the-high-jump-1.1314021
 http://metro.co.uk/2014/04/07/parachutist-sets-a-world-record-with-bed-sheet-in-14000ft-jump-4691789/
 http://www.people.com/people/article/0,,20806531,00.html
 http://www.panamericanworld.com/en/article/venezuelan-ernesto-gainza-defied-death
 http://www.khaleejtimes.com/kt-article-display-1.asp?xfile=data/todayevent/2014/March/todayevent_March30.xml&section=todayevent
 http://www.skydivemag.com/article/custom-cypres-for-project-xcf
 https://radioprvi.rtvslo.si/2019/04/drugi-pogled-ernestogainza/
 https://siol.net/sportal/sportal-plus/ernesto-gainza-ekstremni-sportnik-iz-venezuele-ki-se-je-z-nasel-v-prekmurju-video-453627
 https://siol.net/sportal/sportal-plus/na-zalost-sem-perfekcionist-mislim-da-je-to-tisto-kar-me-je-ohranilo-pri-zivljenju-68647
 http://www.eldiario.ec/noticias-manabi-ecuador/489414-paracaidistas-de-san-vicente-realizan-curso-con-el-record-guinness-ernesto-gainza/
 https://www.reddit.com/r/SkyDiving/comments/azsa78/aerial_stuntman_ernesto_gainza_achieved_a/
 https://people.com/celebrity/ernesto-gainza-sets-skydive-record-with-worlds-smallest-parachute/
 https://www.meltyxtrem.fr/ernesto-gainza-video-du-record-du-monde-du-saut-avec-le-plus-petit-parachute-3-25m-a271811.html
 https://www.zurnal24.si/slovenija/slovenija-je-moja-ljubica-277900
 https://www.revistavenezolana.com/2014/04/el-venezolano-ernesto-gainza-impone-una-marca-mundial-en-dubai/
 https://www.tedxljubljana.com/video/2371/view-from-above
 http://www.yosoyvenezolano.com/noticias-de-venezuela/deportes-venezuela/paracaidista-venezolano-ernesto-gainza/
 https://ekipa.svet24.si/clanek/magazin/na-delu-v-tujini/580a00bf7e95c/ernesto-gainza
 https://www.dnevnik.si/1042741851/sport/ostali-sporti/drugi-sporti/ernesto-gainza-medina-padalec-vznemirjajo-me-nacrtovanje-izvedba-in-malo-prostora-za-napako
 https://www.midwestfreefall.com/about/news/skydiver-lands-worlds-smallest-parachute/
 http://mysofia.bg/entertainment/guiness-recordior-uchi-nashi-parasutisti-krai-radomir/
 https://vid.btv.bg/btv/2019/04/24/6letene_1556113530-1.mp4

Skydivers
Venezuelan sportsmen
People from Valencia, Venezuela
1979 births
Living people